Steve Tuineau Iloa (born 20 September 1969) is a Tongan-born former Spanish rugby union player. He represented  at the 1999 Rugby World Cup.

He made his debut for  against  in Andorra la Vella on 8 November 1997.

References

External links
ESPN Scrum Profile

1969 births
Living people
Tongan rugby union players
Tongan expatriate sportspeople in Spain
Pacific Islanders rugby union players
Spain international rugby union players
Spanish rugby union players
Rugby union locks
Spanish people of Tongan descent
People from Tongatapu
UE Santboiana players